The FA Cup 1978–79 is the 98th season of the world's oldest football knockout competition; The Football Association Challenge Cup, or FA Cup for short. The large number of clubs entering the tournament from lower down the English football league system meant that the competition started with a number of preliminary and qualifying rounds. The 28 victorious teams from the Fourth Round Qualifying progressed to the First Round Proper.

Preliminary round

Ties

Replays

1st qualifying round

Ties

Replays

2nd replays

3rd replay

2nd qualifying round

Ties

Replays

2nd replays

3rd qualifying round

Ties

Replays

4th qualifying round
The teams that given byes to this round are Southport, Workington, Dagenham, Stafford Rangers, Matlock Town, Morecambe, Dartford, Hendon, Kettering Town, Weymouth, Hitchin Town, Tooting & Mitcham United, Minehead, Nuneaton Borough, Wealdstone, Northwich Victoria, A P Leamington, Goole Town, Blyth Spartans and Enfield.

Ties

Replays

2nd replay

1978–79 FA Cup
See 1978-79 FA Cup for details of the rounds from the First Round Proper onwards.

External links
 Football Club History Database: FA Cup 1978–79
 FA Cup Past Results

Qualifying Rounds
FA Cup qualifying rounds